Dimitar Vasilev (born 20 September 1903, date of death unknown) was a Bulgarian épée, foil and sabre fencer. He competed at the 1928 and 1936 Summer Olympics.

References

Year of death missing
Bulgarian male épée fencers
Olympic fencers of Bulgaria
Fencers at the 1928 Summer Olympics
Fencers at the 1936 Summer Olympics
1903 births
Bulgarian male foil fencers
Bulgarian male sabre fencers